Single gender may refer to:
 single-gender world, a fictional society in which only one gender exists
 sex segregation, the practice of only allowing members of one particular gender into an institution
 gonochorism, a system where individuals have a specific gender